The Australian waterfall frog or torrent treefrog (Ranoidea nannotis) is a species of tree frog native to Far North Queensland, Australia. The common name "waterfall frog" is indicative of its habitat of moist, rocky streams, and is often found along waterfalls within its range.

Taxonomy 
The waterfall frog is one of the four species of Australian torrent treefrogs that comprise the Ranoidea nannotis species group. The other species are the mountain mist frog, common mist frog, and the armoured mist frog.

Description

The waterfall frog is large in size, reaching 5.5 cm in length. The dorsal surface is mottled with puck brown. The patterning on the back is similar to its habitat, allowing for effective camouflage against granite. The ventral surface is bright orange, green, and pink in colour, and granular. The posterior ventral surface is translucent, showing internal parts.

The toe pads of R. nannotis are very large in comparison to toe width, to aid in gripping to rocks in the rapids. The nuptial pads of breeding males are also large, covering the entire inner surface of the thumb, with spines also present on the arms and chest. The tympanum is not visible, the fingers are partially webbed, and the toes are completely webbed.

Like the stoney creek frog (Litoria wilcoxi), and many other stream-dwelling frogs, waterfall frogs lack vocal sacs. This may be because the sound of a running stream drowns out any calls, and it becomes a waste of energy.

Ecology and behavior
The waterfall frog is a stream-dwelling frog native to tropical north Queensland, from Paluma to Cooktown, notable in the Mt. Carbine uplands. It has undergone large declines in high-altitude areas (likely from chytridiomycosis), with many populations completely extinct. It is, however, stable in lowland areas.

Conservation status
It is listed as Least concern under both the IUCN Red List.

References

Cunningham, M. 2002. Identification and evolution of Australian torrent treefrogs. Memoirs of the Queensland Museum. 48(1):93-102. Brisbane, Qld.

Further reading
Hodgkison, Simon, Hero, Jean-Marc. 2001. Daily Behavior and Microhabitat Use of the Waterfall Frog, Litoria nannotis in Tully Gorge, Eastern Australia. Journal of Herpetology. 35(1):116-120.

External links

Litoria nannotis at CalPhotos

Endangered fauna of Australia
Litoria
Amphibians of Queensland
Nature Conservation Act endangered biota
Amphibians described in 1916
Frogs of Australia